The 2013 WEC 6 Hours of Spa-Francorchamps was an endurance race held at Circuit de Spa-Francorchamps, Belgium on 3—4 May 2013, and the annual running of the 6 Hours of Spa-Francorchamps. It was the second round of the 2013 FIA World Endurance Championship season.  Defending World Champions André Lotterer, Benoît Tréluyer and Marcel Fässler led a clean sweep of the overall race podium for Audi, while Pecom Racing were victorious in the LMP2 category.  The No. 51 car of AF Corse won the LMGTE Pro class, and 8 Star Motorsports won in LMGTE Am.

Qualifying

Qualifying result
Pole position winners in each class are marked in bold.

  The No. 41 Greaves Motorsport Zytek-Nissan crashed during the qualifying session, setting no time.  The entry was later withdrawn and did not participate in the race.

Race

Race result
Class winners in bold.  Cars failing to complete 70% of winner's distance marked as Not Classified (NC).

References

Spa
Spa
6 Hours of Spa-Francorchamps